Underwater Technology is a peer-reviewed scientific journal covering research on underwater technology, ocean science, and offshore engineering. It is the official journal of the Society for Underwater Technology. It was established in 1975 and is published three times per year in hard copy and electronic format.

The journal publishes both technical papers and technical briefings, the latter being shorter papers. In addition, each issue contains a personal view on a timely, and sometimes controversial, subject of interest and one to two book reviews on recently published books related to the scope of the journal. In addition to its normal open issues, the journal periodically publishes special issues. Past special issues have covered the International Symposium of Occupational Scientific Diving and Oceanology International.

References

External links 
 

Triannual journals
Engineering journals
English-language journals
Publications established in 1975